From 1974 to 1996 the NHS in England was administered by regional health authorities. The regions closely followed the areas of the previous regional hospital boards established in 1947, but in many cases they were renamed.

Each region was subdivided into area and district health authorities, whose disposition as at 1991 is listed below.

In 1996 the regional health authorities were reorganised as NHS health authorities.

An Order in 1994 re-organised these into eight regional health authorities, as follows

Northern and Yorkshire – Cleveland, north Cumbria, Durham, Humberside, Northumberland, North Yorkshire, Tyne and Wear and West Yorkshire
Trent – most of Derbyshire, Leicestershire, Lincolnshire, Nottinghamshire, South Yorkshire
Anglia and Oxford – Bedfordshire, Berkshire, Buckinghamshire, Cambridgeshire, Norfolk, Northamptonshire, Oxfordshire, Suffolk
North Thames – Essex, Hertfordshire, North London
South Thames (South East Thames & South West Thames) – East Sussex, Kent, Surrey, West Sussex, South London
South and West (Wessex and South Western) – Avon, Cornwall, Devon, Dorset, Gloucestershire, Hampshire, Isle of Wight, Isles of Scilly, Somerset, Wiltshire
West Midlands – Hereford and Worcester, Shropshire, Staffordshire, Warwickshire, West Midlands
North West (Mersey & North West) – Cheshire, Greater Manchester, Lancashire, Merseyside, south Cumbria, and Glossop from Derbyshire

Below the regions were area health authorities from 1974 – 1982, and district health authorities from 1974 – 1996.

See also
List of district health authorities in England and Wales

References

Defunct National Health Service organisations
Regional health authorities (pre-1996)
Former subdivisions of England